Eddie Doucette (born June 15, 1940) is a former television and radio sportscaster and currently the president of Doucette Promotions Inc.

Doucette was the original radio play-by-play voice of the Milwaukee Bucks, where he broadcast games for 16 years.  During his career he also called games for various other NBA teams (including the Indiana Pacers, Denver Nuggets, Los Angeles Clippers and Portland Trail Blazers), for Major League Baseball teams (including the San Diego Padres, Cleveland Indians, Houston Astros, Los Angeles Dodgers and Milwaukee Brewers), and for the WFL's Chicago Fire; and he has done various other sports including NFL football, college football, college basketball, PGA Tour golf, boxing, bowling and track and field events.

Along with Jon McGlocklin, Doucette co-founded the MACC Fund in 1976 after his two-year-old son, Brett, was diagnosed with cancer. Today, he serves as the fund's honorary vice-president.

He is a graduate of Evanston Township High School where he has been honored as a Distinguished Alumni  and Michigan State University.  He resides in Poway, California with his wife Karen.  They have two grown sons:  Brett and Cory.

Eddie is known for coining the term "skyhook" when Kareem Abdul-Jabbar shot the ball on May 10, 1974 at Boston Garden in Game 6 of the NBA Finals between the Bucks and Celtics. He also gave a signature call of "Bango!" whenever a Bucks player would make a long-distance shot. Doucette's "Bango" call was also used by his successor, Ted Davis, and is also the name of the Bucks' mascot.

The Naismith Memorial Basketball Hall of Fame has announced that Doucette will receive the Curt Gowdy Media Award in the Electronic Media category during the 2013 Hall of Fame induction ceremony in September. He was inducted into the Wisconsin Broadcasters Association Hall of Fame in 2011.

References

Living people
American Basketball Association announcers
American businesspeople
American radio sports announcers
American television sports announcers
Boxing commentators
Cleveland Indians announcers
World Football League announcers
College basketball announcers in the United States
College football announcers
Denver Nuggets announcers
Golf writers and broadcasters
Houston Astros announcers
Indiana Pacers announcers
Los Angeles Clippers announcers
Los Angeles Dodgers announcers
Los Angeles Rams announcers
Major League Baseball broadcasters
Michigan State University alumni
Milwaukee Brewers announcers
Milwaukee Bucks announcers
National Basketball Association broadcasters
National Football League announcers
Portland Trail Blazers announcers
San Diego Padres announcers
Track and field broadcasters
Bowling broadcasters
1940 births